Parbat is a 1952 Bollywood film starring Prem Nath, Nutan, and K. N. Singh. The film was produced and distributed by Varma Films and directed by O.P. Dutta.

Central to the plot of Parbat is the issue of obsessive love.  As recognized by Levitan and Warner, “movies about obsession definitely have an allure—it's that mixture of excitement and terror, similar to the suspense of a quality scary movie.” While movies about obsessive love have always been popular, Parbat’s notability in dealing with this issue arises from the remarkable cast and crew of the film.  For example, Nutan, the female lead of the film and the object of obsessive love, held the record of five wins of the Best Actress at Filmfare for over 3 decades. As noted by Dhawan “Through her path-breaking roles, Nutan endeavored to change the mindset of the audience about the place of women in our society. She was a pioneer in the depiction of women, particularly, tortured and tormented women, on the screen.”

K.N. Singh who plays the person in obsessive love, was a noteworthy and scary villain.  In his own words, "Even off-screen I was a bad man. One day on my way back from shooting, I had to deliver an envelope at an address given to me by my friend. I pressed the doorbell and, from the moving curtains, I could see a woman hurrying to open the door. When she saw me standing in front of her, she screamed out in fright and ran inside leaving the door open.”

Finally, O.P. Dutta, the movie's director, was the director for as many as 9 movies during his career.  In his sample of the careers of 3129 movie directors, De Vany (2003) finds that 1990 (63%) directors made only one movie, and only 23 (less than 1%) directors made 9 movies. With O.P. Dutta’s career including 9 movies as a director, the above comparison benchmark is an indicator of his remarkable directorial ability.

Plot 
The story revolves around a man (K. N. Singh) who is obsessively in love with Parbat (Nutan).  Things take a turn in Nutan’s life when Pahari (Prem Nath) rescues Parbat and saves her life.  As the plot unfolds, Pahari and Parbat fall in love.

All seems to be going on well until the obsessive lover gets back into Parbat’s life.  To prevent things from getting complicated, Pahari’s family try to get him betrothed to Naina (Purnima) in an arranged marriage.   The movie progresses with the consequences that follow obsessive love.

Cast 
 Prem Nath as Pahari
 Nutan as Parbat
 K.N. Singh
 Purnima as Naina
 Ulhas
 Raj Mehra
 Shobhna Samarth

Soundtrack
Music was composed by Shankar–Jaikishan, while Hasrat Jaipuri and Shailendra wrote the lyrics.

References

External links 
 

1952 films
1950s Hindi-language films